was a town in Tochigi Prefecture, Japan. In 1954 it merged with the villages of Monobe and Naganuma to form the town of Ninomiya. It is now a part of the city of Mooka. The Mooka line runs through Kugeta, connecting it to Shimodate, Mooka, Mashiko and Motegi. On weekends and public holidays a tourist steam train operates on this line.

Kugeta lies between the other constituent parts of Ninomiya,  to the East and Naganuma to the West. No public transport currently connects the three areas.

Dissolved municipalities of Tochigi Prefecture